Towanda Masonic Lodge No. 30 A.F. and A.M. is a historic building located in Towanda, Kansas, built in 1904. It was listed on the National Register of Historic Places in 2004.

Originally constructed by Towanda Lodge No. 30 (which no longer exists), the building was used as a meeting hall until 1996, when it was sold to the City of Towanda and converted into a local history museum, the "Towanda Area Historical Museum".

References

External links
 Kansas Museums: Towanda Area Historical Museum

Clubhouses on the National Register of Historic Places in Kansas
Masonic buildings completed in 1904
Buildings and structures in Butler County, Kansas
Former Masonic buildings in Kansas
Museums in Butler County, Kansas
History museums in Kansas
National Register of Historic Places in Butler County, Kansas